Azam Mosque of Qom, or Masjid-Azam  located in Qom, Iran, was built by Seyyed Hossein Borujerdi, grand Shia Marja' next to the Fatima Masumeh Shrine.

Specifications
On 22 June 1954 the foundation stone of this great mosque was laid in a religious custom. That day fell on the birth day of Ali al-Ridha, eighth Imam of Shia Muslims. The construction of it was ended in 1961. Azam mosque had been built basis on the Islamic architecture. This mosque made of four prayer halls and three towering balconies. The diameter of the large dome of the mosque is 30 metres and its height above the roof of the mosque is 15 metres and 35 metres from the basement of the mosque. The minarets of the mosque has 25 metres length above the roof of the mosque and 45 metres from the basement of the mosque. The upper part of the minarets is 5 metres . It has special section and used to call to prayers (A'zaan). A towering clock tower with a big clock is located in the north of the mosque and this tower can be seen from all the four sides of the mosque.

History
Azam mosque in the Qom was built by Seyyed Hossein Borujerdi, grand Shia Marja' next to the Fatima Masumeh Shrine. On September 1964, Ayatollah Khomeini gave the lecture at ‘Azam mosque in Qom.

In the News

Azam Mosque in Qom has been registered as fourteen thousand historical national monument.
To honor Seyyed Hossein Borujerdi, the fiftieth demise anniversary of him held at Azam mosque in Qom.

gallery

See also
 Holiest sites in Islam
 Lists of mosques
List of mosques in Iran

References

Buildings and structures in Qom
Shia mosques in Iran